Lee Hamilton (born 1931) is an American politician from Indiana.

Lee Hamilton may also refer to:

 Lee Hamilton (sports), American sportscaster and radio talk show host
 Leo Richard Hamilton (1927–2010), Wisconsin politician
 Eugene Lee-Hamilton (1845–1907), English poet

See also